Sumit Sethi is an Indian music producer, DJ, composer, and performer. Sumit Sethi entered the world of music and DJing at the age of 16 Amongst a wide catalogue of songs, the prominent ones are "Veera" (T-Series), "Gaddi Mashook Jatt Di" (Zee Music Company), "Jai Deva" (Bohra Bros). Sumit Sethi and Jasmine Sandlas come together for a Punjabi EDM track Veera. Sumit Sethi is trying to preserve the heritage of Punjabi folk music. His vision is to fuse electronic music with Bollywood sound. He was nearly thrown out of his house as his parents felt that he was throwing away his professional life on a whim.

Filmography

Acting

Film

Singles (music)

References

Living people
Indian male voice actors
Punjabi people
Year of birth missing (living people)
Indian male pop singers